Thailand divides its settlements (thesaban) into three categories by size: cities (thesaban nakhon), towns (thesaban mueang) and townships (or subdistrict municipality) (thesaban tambon).  There are 32 cities as of January 2015. 

The national capital Bangkok and the special governed city Pattaya  fall outside these divisions. They are "self-governing districts".

Several agencies issue population figures. Locally registered Thai populations as compiled by the Department of Local Administration (DLA), also known as, "Locally Registered Thai Population". These figures reflect the migrant, upcountry, and seasonal nature of Thai labor flows to the capital and tourist hot spots, yet maintain upcountry registration. Figures are very different from those by National Statistics Office (NSO), which conduct the decennial census counts that attempt to count total resident Thai population + under 1,000 permanent resident foreigners ("Total Thai Population"). Neither of these offices releases municipal level figures that include non-permanent resident, long stay expatriates and figures for contracted foreign ASEAN migrants (a significant labor segment in cities like Bangkok, Pattaya, Chiang Mai, and Phuket, totaling two to three million workers), though increasingly regularized since 2014. The NSO did release projected figures including regularized ASEAN migrants, i.e., "total resident population" down to the provincial level for 2017.

City municipalities

The table below lists Department of Local Administration (DLA) (local registered Thai) 2020 figures.  For the NSO compiled total Thai resident decennial census municipal counts view here. The cities that are in bold are capitals.

Gallery of cityscapes

Town municipalities 

Department of Local Administration (DLA) figures.  The towns in bold characters are capitals.

Township municipalities
There were 2,266 township municipalities as of 20 December 2017.

References

External links

 
Thailand, List of cities in
Cities